Louis Bourassa (born 20 November 1954) is a Canadian rower. He competed in the men's quadruple sculls event at the 1976 Summer Olympics. He graduated from HEC Montréal in 1982 with an MBA degree and is currently Senior Vice President for Fiera Capital, a Canadian asset management firm headquartered in Montreal.

Personal life
His daughter, Nikki Bourassa is also a rower and competed for Columbia University from 2009 to 2013. She was a staff member at the Berkman Klein Center for Internet & Society at Harvard University.

References

External links
 

1954 births
Living people
Canadian male rowers
Olympic rowers of Canada
Rowers at the 1976 Summer Olympics
Rowers from Montreal